Men's cricket at the 2010 Asian Games was held in Guangzhou, Guangdong, China from 21 to 26 November 2010. In this tournament, 9 teams played. Best 4 teams (three of the four ICC Full Members in Asia, Bangladesh, Pakistan and Sri Lanka as well as Afghanistan who played in the 2010 ICC World Twenty20) directly entered the quarterfinals.

Squads

Results
All times are China Standard Time (UTC+08:00)

Group round

Pool C

Pool D

Knockout round

Quarterfinals

Semifinals

Bronze medal match

Final

Final standing

References

Results

External links
Official Website of 2010 Asian Games 

Men's tournament